The following lists events that happened during 1963 in Cape Verde.

Incumbents
Colonial governor:
Silvino Silvério Marques
Leão Maria Tavares Rosado do Sacramento Monteiro

Events

Sports
Boavista FC won the Cape Verdean Football Championship

Births
May 30: Tito Paris, musician

References

 
1963 in the Portuguese Empire
Years of the 20th century in Cape Verde
1960s in Cape Verde
Cape Verde
Cape Verde